Gregadoo is a suburb of Wagga Wagga situated about 6 km South South-East of Lake Albert, New South Wales, Australia.  It is situated by road, about 9 kilometres south east from Wagga Wagga.

References

External links 

Suburbs of Wagga Wagga